Saddlescombe Preceptory was a priory in West Sussex, England.

References

Further reading

Monasteries in West Sussex